Cane River is an unincorporated community in Yancey County, North Carolina, United States.  It is located west of Burnsville, at the intersection of U.S. Routes 19, 19E and 19W, along the Cane River.

References

Unincorporated communities in Yancey County, North Carolina
Unincorporated communities in North Carolina